Hugo Ralph Vickers DL (born 12 November 1951) is an English writer and broadcaster.

Early life
The son of Ralph Cecil Vickers, M.C., a stockbroker, senior partner in the firm of Vickers, da Costa, by his marriage in 1950 to Dulcie Metcalf, Vickers was born in Lambeth and educated at Eton in the late 1960s and then at Strasbourg University. He has a younger sister, Imogen. His aunt was the politician Baroness Vickers.

Career

Writer and broadcaster
Vickers has written many royal biographies, including ones of Queen Elizabeth The Queen Mother, Princess Alice of Greece and Denmark—which was approved by her son, Prince Philip, Duke of Edinburgh—and Gladys Spencer-Churchill, Duchess of Marlborough. Over the course of his career, he has regularly participated in royal occasions, being a studio guest for both the wedding of Charles, Prince of Wales, and Lady Diana Spencer in 1981 and Diana's funeral in 1997. He commentated on ITN with John Suchet in 1999 for the wedding of Prince Edward, Earl of Wessex, and Sophie Rhys-Jones, for the Queen Mother's centenary celebrations in 2000, and for her funeral two years later. He frequently appeared on CNN's former programme, Larry King Live, and has also appeared on Fox News Channel, MSNBC, and television programmes in Canada, Australia and New Zealand.

Theatrical work
In September 2001, Vickers wrote a Victorian Evening where he performed alongside Prunella Scales, in the presence of the Earl and Countess of Wessex. A year later in 2002, he compiled an evening of poetry, prose and music—called The Queen Mother's Century; in 2005 he devised a programme of Desert Island Discs, interviewing Robert Hardy who portrayed Sir Winston Churchill; he wrote an anthology of readings and music called The Queen's Childhood in September 2006. Once again, Vickers appeared on Desert Island Discs in 2007. In September of that year, he wrote (and designed the set and selected the music on its first showing) his first one-man show, entitled A Lonely Poet, which featured Charles Duff. This show was later renamed The Immortal Dropout.

He is a liveryman of the Worshipful Company of Musicians.

Other activities
Vickers was appointed chairman of the Jubilee Walkway Trust in October 2002, which had been founded in 1977 as a lasting memory of the Queen's Silver Jubilee, and later refurbished and updated to commemorate her Golden Jubilee. Being in this role, he welcomed Queen Elizabeth II and her consort, Prince Philip, Duke of Edinburgh, to the Mall to celebrate the fiftieth anniversary of the Queen's coronation in 2003, and again on 19 November 2007, when the royal couple unveiled the Diamond Wedding panoramic panel in Parliament Square. He is also the Chairman of the Outdoor Trust which puts Walkways into Commonwealth countries.

Vickers is one of the Deputy Lieutenants of Berkshire.

Personal life
In September 1995, Vickers married Elizabeth Vickers, the daughter of his father's first cousin Michael Vickers. They have two sons, Arthur and George, and a daughter, Alice.

Major publications
We Want The Queen (Debrett's Peerage, 1977)
Gladys, Duchess of Marlborough (Weidenfeld and Nicolson, 1979)
The Debrett's Book of the Royal Wedding (Debrett's, 1981)
Cecil Beaton: the Authorized Biography (1985)
Vivien Leigh: A Biography (Hamish Hamilton, 1988)
Alice: Princess Andrew of Greece
Loving Garbo: The Story of Greta Garbo, Cecil Beaton and Mercedes de Acosta (Penguin Random House, 1994; Pimlico, 1995)
Royal Orders: Honours and the Honoured (Pan Macmillan, 1994)
The Kiss: the story of an obsession (1996)
Elizabeth, the Queen Mother (Hutchinson, 2005)
Alexis: the Memoirs of the Baron de Rede (The Dovecote Press, 2005) 
 Frances Campbell-Preston, The Rich Spoils of Time (The Dovecote Press, 2006, editor) 
St George's Chapel, Windsor Castle (3 (Windsor: The College of St George, 2008)
The Royal Line of Succession (Royal Collection Enterprises Ltd, 2009)
Behind Closed Doors: the tragic untold story of Wallis Simpson (Arrow, 2012)
The Royal Mews at Buckingham Palace Official Souvenir Guide (Antique Collectors Club Ltd, 2012)
 James Pope-Hennessy, The Quest for Queen Mary (2018 edition, editor)
The Crown: Truth and Fiction: an Analysis of the Netflix Series THE CROWN (Zuleika Short Books, 2017)
 The Crown Dissected (Zuleika, 2019)
Malice in Wonderland: My Adventures in the World of Cecil Beaton (2021)

Other publications
 Introduction to The Pursuit of Love by Nancy Mitford (London: The Folio Society, 1991)
Introduction to The Unexpurgated Beaton by Cecil Beaton (Phoenix, 2003)
Introduction to Beaton in the Sixties: More Unexpurgated Diaries (Phoenix, 2004)

References

External sources
 
 
 

1951 births
Living people
People educated at Eton College
English biographers
Writers from London
Deputy Lieutenants of Berkshire
English journalists
20th-century biographers
21st-century biographers
University of Strasbourg alumni